McReavy is a surname. Notable people with the surname include:

 Marilyn McReavy (born 1944), American volleyball player
 Pat McReavy (1918–2001), Canadian ice hockey player